Melting Pot is the second studio album by English jazz composer Zoe Rahman, released on 1 July 2006 by Manushi Records.

Critical response

John Fordham of The Guardian rated Melting Pot 3/5 and said, "Rahman's wayward and mobile left-hand patterns swerving under crisp postbop swingers like Camel, soft meditations with repeating low themes emerging under treble trills (Shiraz), dense, hypnotic, multilinear entanglements like the funky The Calling or free-jazz tussles preceding soft rumination like No-One."

Track listing

Personnel
Musicians
Zoe Rahman – piano
Gene Calderazzo – drums
Oli Hayhurst - bass
Pat Illingworth – drums
Jeremy Brown – bass
Idris Rahman – clarinet
Adriano Adewale Itaúna – udu

Awards and nominations

References

External links

2006 albums
Instrumental albums
Zoe Rahman albums